Anucha Nakasai (born 15 April 1960) is a Thai politician.  he serves as Prime Minister's Office Minister in the second cabinet of Prime Minister Prayut Chan-o-cha.

Personal life and education 
Anucha Nakasai was born on 15 April 1960 in Pho Nang Dam Tok, Sapphaya District, Chainat Province. He graduated from Bodindecha (Sing Singhaseni) School and then graduated with a bachelor's degree in Law from Ramkhamhaeng University in 1984.

In family life, He married Porntiwa Nakasai, former Minister of Commerce and former Secretary-General of Bhumjaithai Party. He has two children, In 2014 He has divorce Porntiwa Nakasai.

Careers 
Anucha Nakasai is a member of the House of Representatives of Chainat Province under the Thai Rak Thai Party and later in 2007, political rights were disqualified for five years as the executive director of the Thai Rak Thai Party, which was dissolved in the 2006 party dissolution case. Anucha Nakasai also gave political support to the Bhumjaithai Party whose ex-wife is also the party secretary. In 2018, Anucha moved to work with Palang Pracharath Party along with taking the position of Party Executive Committee and stepped up as party secretary on 27 June 2020 later in August of the same year He was appointed Minister to the Prime Minister's Office.

References 

Living people
Anucha Nakasai
Anucha Nakasai
Anucha Nakasai
Anucha Nakasai
Anucha Nakasai
1960 births
Anucha Nakasai